Daniella Velloso Borges Ribeiro (born 26 March 1972) is a federal senator of Brazil representing her home state of Paraíba. She was previously served in the Legislative Assembly of Paraíba from 2011 to 2019 and was vereador of Campina Grande from 2009 to 2011.

Personal life
Ribeiro was born to Enivaldo Ribeiro and Virgínia Velloso Borges. Her father Enivaldo is also a politician who served as mayor of Capina Grande from 1977 to 1983, while her brother Aguinaldo served as minister of cities from 2012 to 2014. She is divorced and has three children: Lucas, Marcella, and Gabriel. She has degrees from the Federal University of Paraíba and the University of Brasília.

Political career
In the 2008 election Ribeiro was elected to the City Council of Campina Grande with 6,838 votes. Ribeiro was then elected to the Legislative Assembly of Paraíba in 2010 with 29,863 votes.

Along with Veneziano Vital do Rêgo, Ribeiro was elected to the Federal Senate  in the 2018 Brazilian general election.

References

1972 births
Living people
People from Campina Grande
University of Brasília alumni
Progressistas politicians
Members of the Federal Senate (Brazil)
Members of the Legislative Assembly of Paraíba
Brazilian women in politics